Aleurodothrips is a genus of thrips in the family Phlaeothripidae.

Species
 Aleurodothrips fasciapennis

References

Phlaeothripidae
Thrips genera